Mioveni is a town in Argeș County, Romania, approximately 15 km (9 miles) north-east of Pitești. , it had a population of 31,998. The town administers four villages: Clucereasa, Colibași, Făgetu and Racovița.

History 

It was first mentioned in a written record in 1485. It developed much in the 1970s after the construction of the Automobile Dacia manufacturing plant, inaugurated in 1968. There is also a Nuclear Research Institute, that builds components and materials for the Cernavodă Nuclear Power Plant, and a high security prison.

It officially became a town in 1989, as a result of the Romanian rural systematization program. Prior to April 1989, when it was declared a town, the place was a commune under the name of Colibași. In 1996, the historic name of Mioveni was revived, although the old village had been completely razed under the Communist regime in order to make way for new urban construction.

Economy 
Automobile Dacia is headquartered in the town.

Sports

Its football team, CS Mioveni (formerly Dacia Mioveni) played in the Romanian first league for two seasons: in 2007–08 and in 2011–12. They also reached the semifinals of the 2007–08 Romanian Cup.

Natives
 Andrei Panait

Twin cities
  Nagyvázsony – Hungary
  Probištip – North Macedonia
  Kiskunlacháza – Hungary
Planned partner city relations:
  Tököl – Hungary
  Kaunas – Lithuania

Notes

External links 

 Official site

Populated places in Argeș County
Localities in Muntenia
Towns in Romania
Monotowns in Romania
Socialist planned cities